Saint Sophia Cathedral is a Greek Orthodox church on Moscow Road in the Bayswater area of London.

It was consecrated as the Church of the Holy Wisdom on 5 February 1882 by Antonios, Metropolitan of Corfu, as a focus for the prosperous Greek community that had settled in London, particularly around Paddington, Bayswater and Notting Hill.

Today, in addition to its regular Saturday and Sunday services, it hosts a Greek polyphonic choir, Byzantine music, and an associated school in which pupils discover the history and language of Greece and take Greek dancing lessons.

History

This was the third church to bear this name, the previous two (at Finsbury Square and at 82 London Wall) having been outgrown by the population of the Orthodox community, which had been swelled by settlers from the Greek diaspora and visitors who came through the busy shipping routes that converged on London.

St Sophia was commissioned by a committee presided over by Emmanuel Mavrocordato (1830–1909), assisted by Constantinos A lonidis, Sophoclis Constantinidis, Petros P. Rodocanachi, Paraskevas Sechiaris and Demetrius Stefanovich Schilizzi (1839–1893) and the lawyer and traveller, Edwin Freshfield. The cost of £50,000 was raised in three years by the Greek community, including prosperous and influential London merchants and financiers. The first Liturgy was celebrated on 1 June 1879, 18 months after Eustratios Ralli laid the first stone. The cathedral recently opened a small museum to display some of the treasures donated to the cathedral by its 19th-century patrons and its links to London's Greek community.

In 1922 the Greek Ecumenical Patriarchate chose St Sophia as a Cathedral of the Metropolis of Thyateira and Great Britain, encompassing all Orthodox Christians in the British Isles and Malta.

During World War II London became the seat of the Greek government in exile, St Sophia therefore became the cathedral of the Greek Nation. It was bombed during the Blitz, but was subsequently repaired.

In 2006 a museum opened in the basement of the church.

Architecture

St Sophia is a Byzantine Revival design by architect John Oldrid Scott. Scott was responsible for many significant British churches, and was subsequently commissioned by Ralli to build St Stephen's Greek Orthodox Chapel in West Norwood Cemetery in 1873.

From the outside the Cathedral appears relatively modest, only hinting at its style through the domed roof and arched windows. Inside it is elaborately decorated with polychromatic marble. 

The iconostasis (screen of icons) was painted by Ludwig Thiersch, who had studied religious painting in Athens. He had suggested that the walls were not decorated with frescos, because of the damp climate in London. Instead, the trustees commissioned Byzantine-inspired mosaics from G M Mercenero & Co, to the designs of A G Walker. From 1926 more mosaics were commissioned from Boris Anrep.

Notes and references
Notes 
  
References

Further reading
 Greek Orthodox Cathedral of Saint Sophia with Museum on Culture24
Timotheos Catsiyannis, The Greek Community of London (London, 1993)
Michael Constantinides, The Greek Orthodox Church in London (London, 1933)
George Kakavas (ed.), Treasured Offerings. The Legacy of the Greek Orthodox Cathedral of St. Sophia, London (Athens, 2002)

External links

 

Sophia
Churches completed in 1882
19th-century Eastern Orthodox church buildings
Byzantine Revival architecture in the United Kingdom
London
Grade I listed churches in the City of Westminster
Bayswater
Church buildings with domes
Grade I listed cathedrals
Cathedrals in London